Dimes Square is a nickname for a so-called "microneighborhood" of Manhattan, roughly located in between Chinatown and the Lower East Side neighborhoods of New York City. The exact perimeter of the neighborhood is debated. 
The neighborhood and its culture became a subject of interest among some New York City media professionals beginning in 2021, and the term has become a metonym for a handful of associated countercultural and aesthetic movements centered in New York.

Media associated with the neighborhood include the podcast Red Scare, pirate radio station Montez Press Radio, and print newspaper The Drunken Canal.

Origin of name 
The nickname originates from the restaurant Dimes located at the intersection of Canal Street and Division Street. The nickname has transitioned from a term used "jokingly" to one used "semi-seriously".

In popular culture 

A New York Times piece cited the neighborhood's emergence as a cultural hub during the pandemic. The Times again referenced the neighborhood and associated podcasters in a supposed revival of traditionalist Catholicism in New York.

References

Lower Manhattan
Chinatown, Manhattan
Lower East Side